Porin Ässät (Finnish for Pori Aces or Aces of Pori) is a professional ice hockey club based in the town of Pori, Finland. They play in the Finnish elite league, Liiga. They play in the Isomäki Areena. The team is also referred to as Pata and The Red Machine of Pori (Porin Punakone).

The full name of the company operating the team is at present HC Ässät Pori Oy. They have won three Finnish Championships in ice hockey (1971, 1978, and 2013), and several other medals — most recently silver in 2006. In addition, both Karhut and RU-38 were one-time champions each. Ässät has always played in the first-tier league (Liiga and SM-sarja) except for the 1989–90 season played in I-Divisioona. Ässät is also first-time Suomen Cup champion from 1967. Ässät is tied with HJK and Kiffen as the 7th best team in Finland by titles.

Ässät's main rival is Rauman Lukko, due to it being the closest team to Ässät by location and them being located in the same region, Satakunta. Their games are referred to as "Satakunnan derby"

History

First Championship (1970–1971) 

For the season 1970–71, Ässät got a high-class returnee from Helsinki when Veli-Pekka Ketola returned to Pori after playing for one season in Jokerit. Alpo Suhonen also returned to Ässät after Ketola. Ketola's return to his home club gave rise to a huge training enthusiasm in other players as well, and coach Lasse Heikkilä took the team on a training trip to Moscow before the start of the season. The trip to the Soviet Union started training very early, by the standards of the time, because there was no ice on Pori in early autumn. In the 1970–71 season Ässät finished third in the regular season after Jokerit and HIFK. In the final series, everything fell into place, Ässät lost only one of their ten matches and overtook the Helsinki clubs ahead. The gold medals were finally secured by a five-point difference to the Jokerit who came in second. The first championship came under the leadership of the forward trio Erkki Väkiparta - Veli-Pekka Ketola - Tapio Koskinen. Other lines behind No. 1 were also able to provide to the team. There were also big names in the defense, such as Antti Heikkilä and Pekka Rautakallio. Veli-pekka Ketola was the highest point scorer in the SM-sarja during the 1970–71 season with 42 points, of which 25 were goals and 17 were assists. Ässät's captain during the season was Raimo Kilpiö. Ässät's number one goalie was Jorma Valtonen who played every game of the season. Valtonen finished the season with a .922 save percentage.

Championship 1977–78 
The 1977–78 season again raised hopes of success when Pekka Rautakallio and Veli-Pekka Ketola returned to Ässät from North America. In addition, promising young people played in the club, such as Arto Javanainen, Kari Makkonen, Tapio Levo and Harry Nikander. The aces finished second in the regular season after Tappara and defeated TPS 3–2 in the semi-finals. The final series against Tappara did not start promisingly, as Tappara won the first match in Tampere 8–0. However, Ässät won the rest of the games, and the club achieved its second Finnish Championship. The last match at the Porin jäähalli (now Isomäki Areena) was estimated to have been attended by more than 14,000 spectators, even though only 8,600 spectators should have been allowed into the arena at that time. There were more spectators in the auditorium than in any other previous hockey match played in Finland. In the early years of the SM-liiga in the second half of the 1970s, Ässät was one of the league's absolute top teams. The most important player on the team was the captain, center Veli-Pekka Ketola, who had returned from the North American WHA League. Ketola broke the point record in the playoffs at the time.

2012–13: Surprise Championship 

The 2012–13 season went differently for Ässät. It started the season strongly, but by the turn of the year had fallen below the playoff line. The team sold its No. 1 center, Stephen Dixon to a KHL team Lokomotiv Yaroslavl. At the end of January Ässät started the longest winning streak in their history, ending only in the last previous round of the regular season with an overtimetime loss against Oulu Kärpät. The standings rose from twelfth to fourth. In the quarterfinals, Ässät beat KalPa 4–1 in the best of 7 series. Semifinals against JyP Ässät started with an overtime win when Michael Ryan scored the winning time in 92.51. Ässät won the second match in Pori 2–0 and the third in Jyväskylä 1–4. JyP narrowed the situation with their 1–2 away victory, but Ässät won the fifth match 0-1 and advanced to the finals. Tappara won the first final 2–1 after Jukka Peltola scored five seconds before the end of regulation time. The second final match in Pori was won by Ässät 5–1. In the third match, Tappara was better with the score of 3-2, and the winning goal was scored by Niclas Lucenius just one second before the end of regulation time. Ässät won the fourth match 4–0 in their home arena. In the fifth final match, Ässät took away the victory with a final score of 2-1. Veli-Matti Savinainen finished the winning goal from Ville Uusitalo's pass in the third overtime in 108.59. The match was the longest final match in SM-liiga history and the third longest in all playoffs. Ässät won the Finnish Championship after beating Tappara in the sixth final 3–2 with Jyri Marttinen's goal, and at the same time the whole series was won by Ässät 4–2. The Pori team had won their previous championship in 1978. A real generational change was seen after the match, when the captain of the 1978 championship team, Veli-Pekka Ketola, came on the ice to hand over the Kanada malja to captain Ville Uusitalo.

Current Season (2022–23) 

Ässät signed players considered as top tier players like Jesse Joensuu, Roope Talaja, Jan-Mikael Järvinen, Ian McCoshen, Dominic Turgeon, Niklas Rubin and Joachim Rohdin. Ässät also picked up some of their own junior players from the U20 league. Ässät also published their future plans like the player budgets for example. Ässät named Jesse Joensuu as captain. Alexander Ruuttu, Niklas Appelgren and Jan-Mikael Järvinen were named as assistant captains. Ässät hired a new sports manager, Janne Vuorinen, to replace Tommi Kerttula.

Ässät started the 2022–23 season by winning the Pitsiturnaus tournament for the first time since 2004. Ässät's first regular season game was against Ilves, Ässät lost 3–0. Ässät's first victory came at a home in a game against JYP HT, Ässät won 5–0. The first Satakunnan derby game was played in the West Areena on 21 October 2022, the game ended in Lukko's 2–6 victory.

On February 13, Ässät announced that it had signed goaltender Cody Porter to a contract covering the rest of the season due to Niklas Rubin's injury on 8th February. Porter was later sent back to RoKi on a loan.

On 4th March 2023, Ässät secured a playoff spot with a 2–1 win against Lukko in the last Satakunta derby of the regular season. Ässät and Lukko played 6 regular season games against each other with 3–3 wins and 9–9 points.

Ässät finished 8th in the regular season with 91 points and faces HC TPS in the first round of the playoffs in a best-of-three series. Ässät beat TPS in the first game 2–1. TPS beat Ässät in the 2nd game 2–1. TPS scored their winning goal in the last minutes of the third period after a rather questionable penalty when TPS player Taneli Ronkainen pushed Ässät player Emil Erholtz on TPS goaltender Lassi Lehtinen, wich got Erholtz a 2 minute penalty, during wich TPS scored their goal. The linesman director of Liiga, Jyri Rönn, admitted the mistake and apologized to Ässät after the incident. Ässät beat TPS in the last game 2–1 and will face Ilves in the 2nd round.

Ässät's first game against Ilves ended in a 5–1 loss.

Team identity

Logo

Ässät's primary logo is a spade (♠️) inside a black ring. Ässät has used that logo from 1967 to 1982. It was taken into use again in 1994. The logo was designed by Vesa Antikainen

Uniforms

Ässät's home uniform during the 2022–23 season is red with a small white stripe on the bottom part of the jersey and with white on the shoulders. Ässät wears red pants, red socks with a white stripe and use a white helmet. The away jersey is white with a red stripe on the bottom and with red on the shoulders. Ässät wears red pants, white socks with a red stripe and a white helmet.

Special uniforms 
Ässät's official third jersey is black.

On 15.10 2022, Ässät wore a black-white-pink jersey in a cancer awareness game. The jerseys were sold and the money donated to charity.

Porin Päivä -jersey is a jersey that Ässät uses during Porin Päivä, a day that celebrates culture from Pori. It has all the players name tags changed to how a person from Pori would pronounce it. For example, Simon Åkerström's name turned into "Ookkerströmmi".

Ässät has used a Karhut jersey and many versions of the RU-38 jersey.

Ässät has used new versions of many of their old jerseys.

Mascot
Ässät's mascot has been Rysty Mesikämmen since 2017. Rysty Mesikämmen is a brown bear who wears an ice hockey helmet and Ässät's jersey with the number 67.

Women's team

Porin Ässät also had a team in the Naisten SM-sarja from 1982 to 1995. The team dropped out of the league in the spring of 1995 and then took a three-year break. Ässät women's team started playing in the I. divisioona (now Naisten Mestis) in the 1998–99 season. The following season, it got to try to rise back to the SM-sarja, however, remaining sixth in the eight-team qualifiers. All four SM-sarja teams retained their spots. After the qualifiers, the team played three more seasons in Divisions I and II with no significant success and then quit in the spring of 2003. The brightest star and statistically the best player on the Ässät Women's team was Sari Fisk.

Ässät has had a hockey school for women called Ässät Gold Stars since 2020 and a team for girls called Ässät Red Stars.

Successful players
  Sari Marjamäki (née Fisk) (four-time European champion and six-time World Championship bronze medallist)
  Sofianna Sundelin (Olympic bronze medallist and a World Championship bronze medallist)
  Anne Haanpää (née Bäckman) (4-time European champion)
  Sanna Kanerva (1995 European champion)
  Sanna Sainio (top-three point scorer for Ässät)
  Tatyana Tsaryova (first-time World Championship bronze medallist)

International players 

  Lena Kofod 1999-2000
  Violetta Simanova 1999-2000
  Tatjana Tikhonov 1999-2000
  Sandra Toon 1999-2000
  Tatyana Tsaryova 1999-2000

Players and personnel

Current roster
Loan players written in italic text.

Staff
Updated May 2, 2022

Captains

Coaches

Ässät players in the NHL 

Ässät players that play or have played in the National Hockey League, text in bold implies that the player currently plays for Ässät:

Honours

Domestic

SM-liiga / SM-sarja (Finnish Championship Series) 
 Finnish Championship: Kanada-malja (3): 1970–71, 1977–78, 2012–13
 First in regular season: Harry Lindbald Memorial Trophy (1): 1978–79
 Best ice hockey team in Finland: Aaro Kivilinna Memorial Trophy (1): 1979–80
 Runner-up (4): 1978–79, 1979–80, 1983–84, 2005–06
 Bronze (2): 1975–76, 1994–95

Mestis / I-Divisioona 

I-Divisioona winner (predecessor to Mestis): 1989–90

Pitsiturnaus: 
 Pitsiturnaus winner: Knypyl-pysti (5): 1994, 1995, 1999, 2004, 2022
 Pitsiturnaus runner-up (5): 1997, 2009, 2011, 2013, 2019

Finnish cup: 
 Winners (1): 1967

International

IIHF European Cup: 
 Bronze (1): 1978–79

Retired numbers

All Ässät's retired numbers are hanging from the rafters of the arena except for Jaroslav Otevrel's number.

List of retired numbers:

International tournaments

IIHF European Cup 
Text in bold implies that Ässät won the game.

Other international games 
Text in bold implies that Ässät won the game. Only games played after the year 2000.

Franchise records

These are the top-five-point-scorers in franchise history. Figures are updated after each completed Liiga season.
  – current Ässät player
Note: Pos = Position; GP = Games Played; G = Goals; A = Assists; Pts = Points

Sources:

League records

I-divisioona 
Ässät played one season in the I-divisioona. They broke several records, but they only hold two records.

Most points by a player in a season: Arto Heiskanen, 110 points.

Most goals by one team in a game: 20

SM-sarja and SM-liiga 
Fastest overtime goal: Feetu Knihti, four seconds. (as of 24 February 2022)

Home arena

Home arena 

The Isomäki Areena was opened in 1964 as an outside artificial ice rink. The arena was finished in 1971 with a capacity of 8 000 spectators. As of 2022, the spectator capacity is 6 350–6 500 depending on which team is playing.

Today the Isomäki Areena is known for its close atmosphere and reputation as a difficult place for away teams. The arena is located in the Pori sporting center in the Isomäki district. It was last renovated in 2014–2016, and its name was officially changed to Isomäki Areena. The current audience capacity of the arena is 6,350-6,500 people. The name of the arena was changed to West Areena for the 2022–23 season.

Arena music 
Ässät's goal song is Patasydän by Nuoret vihaiset miehet featuring Olli Lindholm. Patasydän was specifically made for Ässät.

In the start of every game the arena plays Isomäen legenda by Remix. The song is also made specifically for Ässät.

Their entrance music (played when the players come on the ice) is "Touch and go" from Emerson, Lake & Powell.

Ässät also uses different rock music like Hells Bells from AC/DC.

Training facilities 
Ässät mainly trains in the Isomäki Areena ice rink, but they also use the Astora Areena, wich was constructed in 2011. Astora Areena is in the ownership of Porin Ässät ry and is also used by all Ässät junior teams.

The Astora Areena has a kiosk, several dressing rooms, an ice hockey rink and a small stand that can hold up to 540 people. The Porin Ässät ry's office is also located in the arena

Fans

Ässät's has a fan organization "Pataljoona" (Finnish for battalion). In 2022, Ässät got a 2nd fan organization called "Karhunkämmen".

Ässät's fans are known for their crazy behaviour and being loud in the arena, mostly in the Seisomakatsomo (standing auditorium). During the 2008–09 season, Pataljoona was the third largest fan organization by members in Finland. Ässät also has fans in a group called EtäPata. The group is made out of fans living outside of Pori that mostly watch Ässät's away games.

During the 2006 playoffs, many Ässät fans and players got a red-black-white mohawk, which became a tradition for all of Ässät's playoff appearances since then.

Famous Ässät fans
Olli Lindholm (1964–2019), Ässät fan and one of the singer of Ässät's goal song "Patasydän"
Simo Frangén,

Rivalries

Ässät's main rivals are considered to be Rauman Lukko and Vaasan Sport.

Ässät and Lukko are rivals mainly because of their cities being located in the same region and their arenas being about 50 kilometers from each other (If going along the E8 road). The largest victory in the Satakunnan derby came in 1978 when Ässät beat Lukko 17–3 at home.

Ässät's rivalry against Sport caught its heat during the 2009 SM-liiga qualifiers. Ässät beat sport in the game seven of the qualifiers and thus kept their spot in the SM-liiga.

Notes

References

External links
  

Ice hockey teams in Finland
Ice hockey clubs established in 1967
Sport in Pori
Ässät
Liiga teams
Liiga
Sport in Satakunta